Hruševec is a small settlement on the left bank of the Voglajna River in the Municipality of Šentjur, in eastern Slovenia. The settlement, and the entire municipality, are included in the Savinja Statistical Region, which is in the Slovenian portion of the historical Duchy of Styria.

Notable people
Notable people that were born or lived in Hruševec include:
Franjo Malgaj (1894–1919), First World War officer

References

External links
Hruševec at Geopedia

Populated places in the Municipality of Šentjur